The 2022–23 Northeastern Huskies Men's ice hockey season is the 91st season of play for the program. They represent Northeastern University in the 2022–23 NCAA Division I men's ice hockey season and for 39th season in the Hockey East conference. The Huskies will be coached by Jerry Keefe, in his second season, and play their home games at Matthews Arena.

Season
The Music City Hockey Classic, which was scheduled to take place in Nashville on November 25th, had to be moved to the Ford Ice Center Bellevue in nearby Bellevue, Tennessee. The change in venue was caused by a water main break at the Bridgestone Arena.

Departures

Recruiting

Roster
As of August 11, 2022.

Standings

Schedule and results

|-
!colspan=12 style=";" | Regular Season

|-
!colspan=12 ! style=""; | 

|-
!colspan=12 style=";" | Regular Season

|-
!colspan=12 style=";" |

Scoring statistics

Goaltending statistics

Rankings

References

2022-23
Northeastern
Northeastern
Northeastern
Northeastern